Vítor Manuel Costa Riça (born 3 May 1974 in Chaves, Vila Real District) is a Portuguese retired footballer who played as a striker.

References

External links

1974 births
Living people
People from Chaves, Portugal
Portuguese footballers
Association football forwards
Liga Portugal 2 players
Segunda Divisão players
C.D.C. Montalegre players
AD Fafe players
Moreirense F.C. players
C.F. União de Lamas players
S.C. Covilhã players
G.D. Chaves players
S.C. Dragões Sandinenses players
C.D. Feirense players
A.D. Lousada players
Portuguese expatriate footballers
Expatriate footballers in China
Expatriate footballers in Switzerland
Portuguese expatriate sportspeople in China
Portuguese expatriate sportspeople in Switzerland
Sportspeople from Vila Real District